Union Pacific Bridge may refer to:

Blair Bridge (Union Pacific Railroad), across the Missouri River between Blair, Nebraska and Harrison County, Iowa
St. Joseph Union Pacific Bridge, crossing the Missouri River between St. Joseph, Missouri, and Elwood, Kansas
St. Paul Union Pacific Rail Bridge, crossing the Mississippi River between Saint Paul and South Saint Paul, Minnesota
St. Paul Union Pacific Vertical-lift Rail Bridge, crossing the Mississippi River in St. Paul, Minnesota
Union Pacific Intermodal Bridge, crossing the Kansas River in Kansas City, Missouri
Union Pacific International Railway Bridge, crossing the Rio Grande between Laredo, Texas, and Nuevo Laredo, Tamaulipas
Union Pacific International Railroad Bridge (Eagle Pass–Piedras Negras), crossing the Rio Grande between Eagle Pass, Texas and Piedras Negras, Coahuila, Mexico
Union Pacific Missouri River Bridge, crossing the Missouri River between Council Bluffs, Iowa and Omaha, Nebraska